Sanxiang noodle is one of the famous local food of Zhongshan city, Guangdong province, China. It has a history of more than 200 years. Because of the special recipe and techniques, the noodle is round and stretchy, which is similar to Guiling noodle, another well-known noodle of China. There are many different types of sanxiang noodle according to people's favor. People usually eat it with the company of meat, chicken, vegetables, roast pork, pork liver and so on. It can boiled as well as fryed.

History 

Sanxiang noodle has a history of more than 200 years. It originated from a small village in a town called Baishihuang (“白石环”). The noodle is majorly made by glutinous rice. When the ancestor in Baishihuang was making noodle, they used spring water from the mountain. Whenever the festivals came, the local people celebrated them with this special food. In lunar July 14, everybody in the village ate this special noodle for breakfast and lunch. It is said that this kind of noodle symbolizes good luck because its length and shape. Since the 1980s, the food department of the city has built factories for exporting Sanxiang noodle. Thanks for this, Sanxiang noodle has become one of the five famous brands of noodle in Guangdong province.

Preparation

Traditional   
About 150 years ago, the material of Sangxiang noodle is rice, especially overnight rice. People at that time were struggling to make their ends meet. Therefore, they would not waste any food even the leftovers. Living in such situation, people were very creative in making good use of overnight rice. They put it under the sun which dried the water out of the rice. Then they ground them into powder. With fresh and sweet fountain water, they made the powder into a dough. They kneaded the dough skillfully and carefully made it into slim noodles.

Modern  
Nowadays, the traditional methods of making Sanxiang noodles are rarely used because of the huge demand of the market and the development of technology. Machines that make Sanxiang noodles have been vastly applied. Besides, the recipes of making Sanxiang noodles has also been updated because of the diversity of food and people's appetite.

References

Chinese noodles